Jan Peeters can refer to:

Jan Peeters (politician) (born 12 January 1963), a Flemish politician
Jan Peeters I (24 April 1624 – 1677), a Flemish Baroque painter